The next United Kingdom general election is scheduled to be held no later than 24 January 2025. Between 32 and 40 seats will be up for election in Wales.

Election

Date 
The Dissolution and Calling of Parliament Act 2022 repealed the Fixed-term Parliament Act 2011 meaning that the latest date that a new election could be called is before 17 December 2024, with election day no later than 24 January 2025. The UK prime minister is also now able to call a general election.

Number of Welsh MPs 
A reduction in the number of Welsh MPs was proposed for the next UK general election. Under the proposals, the number of MPs would be reduced from 40 to 32 and new constituency boundaries have also been proposed.

The revised boundary plans were published on 19 October 2022 with a four-week consultation period following.

Polling

By per cent vote

By seats

See also 
 2021 Senedd election
 Next Senedd election

Notes

References

General elections in Wales to the Parliament of the United Kingdom
Future elections in the United Kingdom